is a passenger railway station  located in the city of Kawanishi, Hyōgo Prefecture, Japan. It is operated by the West Japan Railway Company (JR West). There is a transfer at this station for Kawanishi-Noseguchi Station.

Lines

Station layout
The station consists of two ground-level island platforms serving four tracks, connected by an elevated station building. The station has a Midori no Madoguchi staffed ticket office.

Platforms

Adjacent stations

History
It was renamed to its present name on 1 August 1951. With the privatization of the Japan National Railways (JNR) on 1 April 1987, the station came under the aegis of the West Japan Railway Company.

Station numbering was introduced in March 2018 with Kawanishi-Ikeda being assigned station number JR-G54.

Passenger statistics
In fiscal 2016, the station was used by an average of 19,771 passengers daily

Surrounding area
 Kawanishi-Noseguchi Station (Hankyu Takarazuka Main Line/Nose Electric Railway Myoken Line)
Kawanishi City Central Library
Toyo College of Food Technology
Kawanishi Municipal Kawanishi Elementary School

See also
List of railway stations in Japan

References

External links 

  Kawanishi-Ikeda Station from JR-Odekake.net 

Railway stations in Hyōgo Prefecture
Railway stations in Japan opened in 1893
Kawanishi, Hyōgo